Thomas D. Campbell (1882–1966) was the "World's Wheat King".  On the farms of his Campbell Farming Corporation he grew more wheat than any other farmer or corporation.  He pioneered industrialized corporate farming.  As a consultant in agriculture, he advised the British, French and Soviet governments, including advising Stalin in 1929 on large-scale farming for the Soviet Union's first five-year plan.  He served in the U.S. military in World War II and developed the napalm fire bomb used in the Pacific Theatre.  He became a brigadier general in the Air Force in 1946.

Biography
Thomas was born Thomas D. Campbell, Jr., on February 19, 1882, in North Dakota to Thomas Campbell Sr. and Almira (Richards) Campbell.
The couple were of Scottish descent and had immigrated to North Dakota from Perth, Ontario, in 1875. The couple built a log cabin on 80 acres of land that they had purchased. Thomas was valedictorian of Central High School in 1898, attended preparatory school at Upper Canada College, and later graduated from the University of North Dakota. He was the first to graduate in engineering from the latter school, in 1904. In 1906 he married Bess McBride Bull, daughter of George Bull, co-founder of Cream of Wheat, and the couple moved to Pasadena, California.

Soon after arriving in California, Thomas started working for the J.S. Torrance Farming Corporation in California. He later founded the Campbell Farming Corporation. With America's entry into the First World War, Thomas was part of a group of men who believed the slogan that “Food Would Will the War.” Realizing that wheat would be an integral part of this strategy, Campbell presented a plan to the federal government that would use power equipment to cultivate mass acreages of semi-arid land. He was then told to find land suitable for such an undertaking. He selected four large tracts of land on the Shoshone, Blackfoot, Fort Peck, and Crow Indian reservations in Montana and Wyoming. One of the main stipulations of such an agreement was that the tribes would receive ten percent of the crop’s cash value. The Crow lands Campbell selected were bench land on the western side of the Bighorn River and south of Beauvais Creek. He acquired $2,000,000 financing from J.P. Morgan and began farming  on the Crow Indian Reservation north of the Big Horn River in Montana.

The Thomas D. Campbell House, his childhood home, is listed on the U.S. National Register of Historic Places

See also
Camp Four, a historic site on the U.S. National Register of Historic Places, preserves one of two permanent workcamps, which along with six temporary camps, served one of Campbell's farms during the period from 1920 to the 1960s.

Notes

References

Further reading
"Thomas D. Campbell: The Plower of the Plains", by Hiram Drache, Agricultural History Vol. 51, No. 1, Agriculture in the Great Plains, 1876–1936: A Symposium (Jan., 1977), pp. 78–91

1882 births
1966 deaths
20th-century American farmers
Farmers from North Dakota
Wheat